Extell Development Company is an American real estate developer of residential, commercial, retail, hospitality, and mixed-use properties. Founded in 1989 by Gary Barnett, the company’s portfolio exceeds 20 million square feet. The company has between 125 and 150 employees. Prior to 2005, it was known as Intell Management and Investment.

According to a survey conducted by The Real Deal, Extell is the most active builder in Manhattan, with at least 11 active projects totaling 5.7 million square feet. Extell is known for kickstarting the "Billionaires' Row" towers below Central Park, and for constructing a number of different buildings on the Upper East Side, in Manhattan.

In 2013, Extell came under fire in the New York Post and Gawker Media for building separate entrances for rich tenants and poor tenants in one or more of their Manhattan high-rise buildings.

Properties
Notable properties owned or developed by the company are:
 50 West 66th Street
 995 Fifth Avenue
 Central Park Tower
 One Manhattan Square
 One Riverside Park
 One57
 Riverside South, Manhattan
 The Ariel
 The Orion
 W Times Square

References

External links 
 

American companies established in 1989
Real estate companies of the United States
Companies based in New York City